Events from the year 1879 in Sweden

Incumbents
 Monarch – Oscar II
 Prime Minister – Louis Gerhard De Geer

Events

 - The Gothenburg tram network began operation.
 - The first issue of the Karlstads-Tidningen.
 - The Sabbatsberg Hospital is founded. 
 - The first national Flickskolemöte (Girl School Meeting) to reform female education is summoned by Hilda Caselli.

Births

 13 April – Johan Petter Åhlén, businessman and Olympic medalist (d. 1939)
 26 June – Gustaf Adolf Jonsson, sport shooter (died 1949).
 14 August – Bernhard Larsson, sport shooter (died 1947).
 20 August – Gustaf Lewenhaupt, count, military officer and horse rider (died 1962).
 10 December – Hanna Grönvall, politician and trade union worker (died 1953)

Deaths

 3 January - Anna Johansdotter Norbäck, founder and leader of the religious movement Annaniterna  (born 1804)
 26 February  – Anna Nordlander, painter (born 1843)

References

 
Sweden
Years of the 19th century in Sweden